Wertz Mill is a historic grist mill located in Wernersville, Berks County, Pennsylvania.  It was built in 1892, and is a three-story, brick building with a mansard roof in the Second Empire style. It measures 60 feet by 58 feet, 3 inches, and features a cupola atop the roof.  It has a two-story, brick extension built in the 1930s. The mill remained in operation until 1969.

It was listed on the National Register of Historic Places in 1990.

References

Grinding mills in Berks County, Pennsylvania
Grinding mills on the National Register of Historic Places in Pennsylvania
Industrial buildings completed in 1892
National Register of Historic Places in Berks County, Pennsylvania